FC Prykarpattia-2 Ivano-Frankivsk is a Ukrainian football team based in Ivano-Frankivsk, Ukraine. The club has been featured regularly in the Ukrainian Second Division it serves as a junior team for the FC Spartak Ivano-Frankivsk franchise. Like most tributary teams, the best players are sent up to the senior team, meanwhile developing other players for further call-ups.

FC Spartak Ivano-Frankivsk
Defunct football clubs in Ukraine
Association football clubs established in 1999
Association football clubs disestablished in 2003
1999 establishments in Ukraine
2003 disestablishments in Ukraine
Prykarpattia-2 Ivano-Frankivsk